Anton Nikolayevich Gubankov (29 January 1965 – 25 December 2016) was a Russian journalist and civil servant. He worked as a television journalist until 2013. He served as the Director of the Department of Culture in the Russian Ministry of Defence from 2013 to 2016. In this role Gubankov popularised the term "polite people" (вежливые люди) referring to the unmarked Russian soldiers during the 2014 Russian annexation of Crimea. He died in the 2016 Russian Defence Ministry Tupolev Tu-154 crash when he was on his route to Syria with 63 members of the Alexandrov Ensemble with its director Valery Khalilov and 27 others which killed all 92 passengers on board, including Anton.

References

1965 births
2016 deaths
Mass media people from Saint Petersburg
Russian television journalists
Victims of aviation accidents or incidents in Russia
Recipients of the Medal of the Order "For Merit to the Fatherland" II class
Recipients of the Medal of Zhukov
Russian male journalists
Burials at the Federal Military Memorial Cemetery